BYOB is an initialism used on party invitations, meaning "bring your own beverage" or variants. BYOB may also refer to:

B.Y.O.B. (song), a song by System of a Down from their album Mezmerize
BYOB (programming language), a computer programming language
Bring your own bag, a government campaign to discourage plastic shopping bag use